Jack or John Combs may refer to:

 Jack Combs (baseball), Negro league baseball player
 Jack Combs (ice hockey) (born 1988), American ice hockey player
 Jack Combs (television producer), television documentary producer
 John Combs, Canadian judge